Thelema is philosophical and mystical system founded by Aleister Crowley in 1904. This is a list of Thelemites, self-professed adherents of Thelema who have Wikipedia articles.

A 
 Kenneth Anger (b. 1927), American underground experimental filmmaker, actor, and writer

B 
 Frank Bennett (1868–1930), Australian chemist 
 Michael Bertiaux (1935), American occultist
 William Breeze (b. 1955), American writer and musician
 Mary Butts (1890–1937), English modernist writer

C 
 Andrei Chernov (1966–2017), Soviet and Russian programmer
 Marjorie Cameron (1922–1995), American artist, poet, actress and occultist
 Aleister Crowley (1875–1947), English occultist, ceremonial magician, writer, and founder of Thelema

D 
 Lon Milo DuQuette (b. 1948), American writer, lecturer, musician, and occultist

F 
 J. F. C. Fuller (1878–1966), Major-General in the British Army, military historian, and strategist

G 
 Peaches Geldof (1989–2014), English columnist, television personality, and model
 Karl Germer (1885-1962),  German and American businessman and occultist, OHO of OTO (1947–1962)
 Kenneth Grant (1924–2011), English ceremonial magician and advocate of Thelema

H 
 Lady Frieda Harris (1877–1962), English artist known for her design of Crowley's Thoth Tarot
 Leah Hirsig (1883–1975), American schoolteacher and occultist, most famous of Crowley's Scarlet Women
 Sara Northrup Hollister US
 Christopher Hyatt US

I 
 Augustus Sol Invictus US

J 
 Charles Stansfeld Jones Canada
 George Cecil Jones UK

K 
 Richard Kaczynski US 
 Rose Edith Kelly UK
 Francis X. King UK

M 
 Grady Louis McMurtry US
 Marcelo Ramos Motta Brazil
 Martin Lee Stephenson UK

N 
 Nema Andahadna US
 Victor Benjamin Neuburg UK
 Noname Jane US

O 
 Rodney Orpheus UK

P 
 Jack Parsons US

R 
 Theodor Reuss Germany - UK
 C.F. Russell - US

S 
 Phyllis Seckler Canada 
 Wilfred Talbot Smith UK

W 
 Leila Waddell Australia
 James Wasserman UK
 Sam Webster US
 Jane Wolfe UK

Y 
 Gerald Yorke UK